Qalamu (also Romanized as Qalamū) is a village in Rostam-e Do Rural District, in the Central District of Rostam County, Fars Province, Iran. At the 2006 census, its population was 26, in 5 families.

References 

Populated places in Rostam County